Nikolai Nikolaevich Yeremenko Jr. ((14 February 1949, Vitebsk, Belorussian SSR, USSR — 27 May 2001, Moscow, Russia)) was a Soviet and Russian theater and film actor, film director of Belarusian origin. He was awarded People's Artist of Russia in 1994.

Biography
Nikolai was born in Vitebsk, in the family of People's Artist of the USSR Nikolai Yeremenko Sr. (1928—2000) and People's Artist of the BSSR Galina Orlova (1928—2021).

In 1967, he entered the VGIK (workshop of Sergey Gerasimov and Tamara Makarova), graduated in 1971 and in the same year was admitted to the troupe of the National Film Actors' Theatre; since 1976 an actor of the Gorky Film Studio.

In cinema, Nikolai Yeremenko made his debut in 1969 acting in the film By the Lake by Gerasimov. According to the results of the annual poll of viewers in the magazine Soviet Screen, Nikolai was recognized as the best actor in 1980 for the role of Sergey Sergeyevich in the film Pirates of the 20th Century.

In the 1990s, Yeremenko decided on the director's debut — , where he starred with his father. Since 2001, he was the cultural advisor of the Embassy of Belarus in Moscow.

Nikolai died at the Botkin Hospital in Moscow on 27 May 2001, as a result of a stroke. He was buried on 31 May in Minsk in the Eastern Cemetery, next to his father.

Personal life
He married Vera Titova on 5 May 1975. In this marriage, daughter Olga was born. From a civil marriage with Tatyana Maslennikova, his daughter Tatyana (1990) was born.

Selected filmography
Actor
By the Lake (1969) as Alexey
 Hot Snow (1973) as Drozdovsky
 The Red and the Black (1976) as Julien Sorel
 31 June (1978) as Sam Penty, painter
 The Tavern on Pyatnitskaya (1979) as Mikhail Eremin
 Pirates of the 20th Century (1980) as Sergey Sergeyevich 
 The Youth of Peter the Great (1980) as Aleksandr Danilovich Menshikov
 At the Beginning of Glorious Days (1980) as Aleksandr Danilovich Menshikov
 Copper Angel (1984) as Sebastien Valdez
 In Search for Captain Grant (1986) as Lord Glenarvan 
 Lev Tolstoy (1993) as Alexander Goldenweiser 
 I Declare War on You (1990) as Erokhin
 White Nights (1992) as tenant
 Trotsky (1993) as Nahum Eitingon
 Empire under Attack (2000) as Vyacheslav von Plehve
 Chivalric Romance (2000) as Nikephoros Bryennios the Younger
 Give Me Moonlight (2001) as Sergei Kupriyanov
 Brigada (2002) as Yuri Rostislavovich, Kosmos' father

Director
  (1995)

References

External links
 
 Николай  Ерёменко-младший: Биографии актёров и личная жизнь знаменитостей

1949 births
2001 deaths
People from Vitebsk
Russian male film actors
Soviet male film actors
Soviet male stage actors
Russian film directors
Russian male television actors
Recipients of the Lenin Komsomol Prize
Honored Artists of the RSFSR
People's Artists of Russia
Gerasimov Institute of Cinematography alumni
Russian people of Belarusian descent